Archana Shastry is an Indian actress, working in Telugu, Tamil and Kannada films. She was one of the contestants in the first season of Bigg Boss, hosted by N. T. Rama Rao Jr. In November 2019, she married Jagadeesh Bakthavachalam, vice president of a leading health-care company.

Career 
Debuting as Veda in the Telugu film Tapana (2004), she subsequently changed her stage name to Archana, by which she was more popularly known. She is best known for her performances in Nenu (2004), Nuvvostanante Nenoddantana (2005) and Sri Ramadasu (2006) in Telugu and Aa Dinagalu (2007) in Kannada.

Filmography

Television

Films

References

External links 
 

Indian film actresses
Actresses in Kannada cinema
Living people
Actresses in Malayalam cinema
Actresses from Hyderabad, India
Actresses in Tamil cinema
Actresses in Telugu cinema
21st-century Indian actresses
Bigg Boss (Telugu TV series) contestants
Actresses in Hindi cinema
Year of birth missing (living people)